Frank George Cooper (born 25 October 2002) is an English professional footballer who plays as a defender for Kettering Town on loan from  club Mansfield Town.

Playing career
Cooper turned professional at Mansfield Town in May 2021 after impressing academy manager Richard Cooper with his consistent performances. He made his senior debut on 31 August under the stewardship of Nigel Clough, coming on for Tyrese Sinclair as a 77th-minute substitute in a 3–1 defeat at Harrogate Town in the EFL Trophy. He was handed a full debut on 5 October, in a 2–1 defeat to Sheffield Wednesday at Field Mill, and was described as "impressive" in Mansfield-based newspaper Chad. On 1 December, he joined Kettering Town – who were coached by former Mansfield manager Paul Cox – of the National League North on an initial one-month loan. He scored a goal from 30-yards in a 4–0 victory at Leamington on 18 December. He added another goal with a header in a 3–0 win over Curzon Ashton at Latimer Park on 15 January. New manager Ian Culverhouse ensured Cooper's loan was extended after he scored two goals in eight appearances. He was absent throughout March due to injury. He was named as man of the match playing in the central role of a back three during a 1–0 home win over Gloucester City on 15 April. Speaking five days later, Cooper stated that he was enjoying his time at the club: "I love the place to be fair and, for my development, I have learnt so much and I am still learning week in and week out. It's massive for me to come and play men’s football and get quite a lot of game time." He made a total of 24 appearances for Kettering in the 2021–22 season, scoring two goals. Mansfield opted to extend his contract at the end of the season. In June 2022, Cooper returned to Kettering Town on loan.

Personal life
As of October 2021, Cooper was studying sports science at Nottingham Trent University’s Mansfield campus.

Statistics

References

2002 births
Living people
English footballers
Association football defenders
Mansfield Town F.C. players
Kettering Town F.C. players
National League (English football) players
Alumni of Nottingham Trent University